Jawai Bandh is a dam built across the Jawai river, a tributary of Luni river, in Rajasthan.

Geography and History

The dam is situated near Sumerpur town in Pali District of Rajasthan state in India. The dam was built by Maharaja Umaid Singh of Jodhpur.

The idea of building a dam over River Jawai was conceived in 1903 as its flooding waters caused heavy damage in Pali and Jalore district during monsoon. It was finally given shape in 1946. The project was to construct a dam across the river, creation of water reservoir, which could be used for water irrigation and hydel power generation.

The work started on 12 May 1946. By 1951, when first 5-year plan was launched, nearly 124 Lakh Rupees were already spent on this project. The hydel project was suspended, since sufficient pressure was not likely to be available throughout the year, after meeting the irrigation demand. Revised estimated cost was revised to Rupees 300 Lakhs. Project completed in 1957.

This dam covers an area of 13 km2. This is the biggest man made dam in western Rajasthan. Sei dam and Kalibor dam are the feeder dams of the Jawai dam. The catchment area of the dam site is 720 square kilometres and basin is in the shape of a fan.

It is the main water supply source for Pali district. If there is sufficient water in the dam, then some villages of Jalore district and Pali district get water for irrigation from the Jawai dam, which was the main aim in making this dam.

Biodiversity
Jawai is now known for its leopard sightings, bird watching.
Many migratory bird species are spotted here during winter season.
Jawai dam is also known for large crocodile population, as of 2020 there were 377 crocodiles in Jawai Dam.

Gallery

References

 

Dams in Rajasthan
Tourist attractions in Pali district
Dams completed in 1957
1957 establishments in Rajasthan
20th-century architecture in India